Anthony Hickox (born 30th January 1959) is an English film director, producer, actor and screenwriter.

He is best known for his work in the horror genre, with films like Waxwork and its sequel, Waxwork II: Lost in Time, Sundown: The Vampire in Retreat, Hellraiser III: Hell on Earth, and Warlock: The Armageddon. He directed a 1997 film adaptation of the long-running Prince Valiant comic strip starring Stephen Moyer as the eponymous character. His visual style often uses a dual-focus technique in which one person's face takes up most of the screen in profile, with another person shown on the other half of the screen in the background.

Biography

Anthony "Tony" Hickox was born in 1959 in Hampstead, London to a family of filmmakers. He is the eldest son of the director Douglas Hickox and Academy Award-winning editor Anne V. Coates and elder brother of editor Emma E. Hickox and James D.R. Hickox. He is also the great nephew of Lord J. Arthur Rank who controlled the British film industry for many years. 

Hickox was educated at Aiglon College in Switzerland. After starting as a club promoter in London, he came to LA in 1986 and became a writer and director during the late 1980s. He then started directing action movies after a list of 1990s horror films including the third entry in the Hellraiser series. This led to HBO hiring him to make its first action/horror, Full Eclipse, which spawned the Friday night action slot that lasted over 5 years and to which Hickox made several more contributions. At the same time, he continued his deal at Universal where he shot pilots for Extreme, Two, Martial Law and New York Undercover.

After working with Natascha McElhone and William Hurt on Contaminated Man, he went on to direct Katherine Heigl and Stephen Moyer in a feature-length adaptation of the Prince Valiant comic strip. The film was described by one of its actors, Warwick Davis, as "a disaster from start to finish" which was "premiered, panned and bombed". He blames this on Hickox, who he says "seemed intent on partying all night long and giving roles to his friends."

He then directed Steven Seagal in Submerged and Eddie Griffin in Blast, which made over $15 million each via a direct-to-video release. In 2008, he completed the British horror movie Knife Edge. In 2019, he completed Underdogs Rising with Chris Pang and Infamous 6 which shot in Hong Kong, for PopLife Global owned by Ex Chatman of Disney China.

He was on the board of directors of the now-dissolved film distribution company Seven Arts Pictures run by Peter Hoffman, the ex-chairman of Carolco and the production company Medient Studios run by Indian film producer Manu Kumaran.

He is known as a maverick filmmaker often at odds with his producers.  

He married Romanian actress Madalina Anea.

He is working on a Federico Fellini biopic and Zombie Bride shooting in Spain.

Filmography

Feature films
Waxwork (1988)
Sundown: The Vampire in Retreat (1989)
Waxwork II: Lost in Time (1992)
Hellraiser III: Hell on Earth (1992)
Full Eclipse (1993)
Warlock: The Armageddon (1993)
Payback (1995)
Invasion of Privacy (1996)
Prince Valiant (1997)
Storm Catcher (1999)
Jill Rips (2000)
Contaminated Man (2000)
Last Run (2001)
Federal Protection (2002)
Consequence (2003)
Blast (2004)
Submerged (2005)
Knife Edge (2008)
Exodus to Shanghai (2015)
Underdogs Rising (2017)
Infamous 6 (2019)

Television
New York Undercover  episode 3: Missing (1994)
Extreme (1995) - pilot episode 
Two (1995) — pilot episode
Pensacola: Wings of Gold episode: Broken Wings (1998)
Martial Law (1998) — pilot episode
Shoot Me! (2003) - pilot/series

References

External links

English film directors
Horror film directors
Living people
1959 births
Alumni of Aiglon College